Benedetto Caliari (1538–1598) was an Italian painter who was born into a family of artists.  Benedetto's father Gabriele Caliari was a stonecutter.  Benedetto's brother Paolo Caliari is better known as Veronese.

Life 
Veronese's principal assistants were his younger brother Benedetto Caliari and his two sons Carlo or Carletto Caliari (1570–1596) and Gabriele Caliari (1568–1631).  Benedetto Caliari, who was about ten years younger than Veronese, is reputed to have had a very large share in the architectural backgrounds that form so conspicuous a feature in Veronese's compositions.  After Veronese's death in 1588, Benedetto, Carlo and Gabriele completed his unfinished paintings. They often signed collectively as Paolo's heirs.

The Accademia Carrara (Bérgamo, Italy), the Cleveland Museum of Art, the Hermitage Museum, the Honolulu Museum of Art, Kunsthistorisches Museum (Vienna) and Musée des Beaux-Arts de Caen are among the public collections holding works by Benedetto Caliari.

Gallery

References

Freedberg, Sydney Joseph, Painting in Italy, 1500–1600, Penguin, Baltimore, 1975.

1538 births
1598 deaths
16th-century Italian painters
Italian male painters
Painters from Verona
Italian Renaissance painters
Sibling artists